Cloudcuckooland is the debut album by British band the Lightning Seeds, released in 1990. "Pure" was the band's first hit in the United Kingdom, and their only top 40 entry in the United States.

Liverpool scene peers Andy McCluskey and Ian McNabb – frontmen of OMD and the Icicle Works, respectively – appeared in guest roles.

Reception and legacy

Dean Carlson of AllMusic awarded the album 4/5 stars, and wrote: "Even in these early days, with singles like "Pure" and "All I Want", you can hear why comparisons to a less burlesque Pet Shop Boys or a Matthew Sweet synth tribute band didn't have to be unpleasant criticisms."

"All I Want" was covered by Susanna Hoffs, formerly of the Bangles, on her 1996 album Susanna Hoffs. It was a minor US hit and a UK hit at No. 33 for two weeks.

Track listing
The CD version of Cloudcuckooland included the extra track "God Help Them", originally a B-side and not on the LP version. The U.S. track listing differs from the UK version with "God Help Them" replaced by the B-sides "Fools" and "Frenzy", and it was released on the MCA label rather than the indie label Ghetto. The re-release of the U.S. album includes a new recording of "All I Want".

All songs written by Ian Broudie (except where stated).
 "All I Want" – 2:50 (Broudie, Peter Coyle)
 "Bound in a Nutshell" – 4:29
 "Pure" – 3:45
 "Sweet Dreams" – 4:25 (Broudie, Richard Jobson)
 "The Nearly Man" – 3:06
 "Joy" – 4:13
 "Love Explosion" – 4:10
 "Don't Let Go" – 3:54
 "Control the Flame" – 3:22 (Broudie, Peter Coyle)
 "The Price" – 4:20

The track "Sweet Dreams" was released in the U.S. as a promo single on MCA Records, which included a cover of Tim Hardin's "Hang onto a Dream" and a version of "Flaming Sword", originally by Care, a former band of Broudie.

Bonus tracks
UK CD bonus track
 "God Help Them" – 3:44 (Broudie, Paul Simpson)
U.S. bonus tracks
 "Fools" – 4:08 "Frenzy" – 3:56

Personnel

The Lightning Seeds
 Ian Broudie – various instruments, vocals, producer

Production
 Cenzo Townshend – engineer
 Ian McFarlane – assistant engineer
 Paul Cobbold – additional engineer
 Pete Coleman – additional engineer
 Simon Rogers – additional programming
 Steve Brown – additional programming
 Greg Fulginiti – mastering

Additional musicians
 Henry Priestman – piano on "Bound in a Nutshell", organ on "Control the Flame"
 Mickey Kearns – saxophone
 Andy McCluskey – keyboards
 Ian McNabb – backing vocals
 Cate Shanks – backing vocals

Other personnel
 Peter Ashworth – photography

Charts

References

1990 debut albums
The Lightning Seeds albums
Albums produced by Ian Broudie